This article is not about Hugh-Rainard of Tonnerre, bishop of Langres from 1065 to 1084

Hugh of Langres (died 1050) was bishop of Langres.

As a theologian, he wrote a work, De corpore et sanguine Christi, against Berengar of Tours. He had met Berengar and discussed his views at length.

At the Council of Rheims (1049) he was accused of a range of crimes. One defender, Hugh of Besançon, rose but didn't speak. Another, Halinard of Lyon, mitigated the charges, saying Hugh of Langres was guilty of simony and extortion, but not the other matters. Hugh fled the Council, was deposed and excommunicated, went to Rome in 1050 to confess, and died on his way back to France.

Notes

1050 deaths
Bishops of Langres
People temporarily excommunicated by the Catholic Church
11th-century French Catholic theologians
11th-century French Roman Catholic bishops
Year of birth unknown
11th-century Latin writers